Laurence Chalfant Stevens Sickman (1907–1988) was an American academic, art historian, sinologist and Director of the Nelson-Atkins Museum of Art in Kansas City.

Education
As a high school student, Sickman became interested in Japanese and Chinese art. In 1930, he earned a degree in the field at Harvard, where he also became fluent in Chinese. He traveled throughout China under the newly formed Harvard-Yenching Fellowship, purchasing Chinese paintings, sculpture and furniture for collection and study at the William Rockhill Nelson Gallery of the Nelson-Atkins Museum. He traveled on a scholarship to China, where he met Langdon Warner, his former Harvard professor and one of the trustees of the Nelson museum, which was being established. Warner, who had been appointed to build a collection for the museum, initially tutored Sickman. Sickman was later given the responsibility of buying works on his own by means of a $11 million donation by Kansas City Star founder William Rockhill Nelson.

Career
In 1931, Sickman joined the staff of the Nelson-Atkins Museum of Art.  In 1935, he became the curator of Oriental Art at the museum. His museum curatorial career was interrupted by military service in the Second World War.

Honors
In 1973, Sickman was awarded the Charles Lang Freer Medal.

World War II
Sickman's war service took him to Tokyo during the occupation of Japan where he served as one of the "Monuments Men" under  General Douglas MacArthur's Monuments, Fine Arts, and Archives (MFAA) section. Among those serving with Sickman in Tokyo were Sherman Lee and Patrick Lennox Tierney.

Curatorship after World War II
At war's end, he returned to the Nelson-Atkins museum, where he was director from 1953 through 1977.

Selected works
In a statistical overview derived from writings by and about Laurence Sickman, OCLC/WorldCat encompasses roughly 50+ works in 90+ publications in 4 languages and in 3,000+ library holdings.  
 1956 – The Art and Architecture of China (with Alexander Coburn Soper). Baltimore, Maryland: Penguin Books.   OCLC 192176467

See also 
 Roberts Commission
 Monuments, Fine Arts, and Archives program
 Monuments Men Foundation for the Preservation of Art

Notes

References
 American Commission for the Protection and Salvage of Artistic and Historic Monuments in War Areas. (1946). Report. Washington, D.C.: U.S. Government Printing Office.

External links 
 PBS (Oregon Public Broadcasting):  "The Rape of Europa.", 2006 film, aired November 24, 2008
 Monuments Men Foundation: Monuments Men> Sickman, Maj. Laurence

1988 deaths
1907 births
Harvard University alumni
American art historians
American art curators
American sinologists
Art and cultural repatriation after World War II
Directors of museums in the United States
Monuments men
20th-century American historians
American male non-fiction writers
20th-century American male writers